Holocacista pariodelta is a moth of the family Heliozelidae. It was described by Edward Meyrick in 1929. It is found in India.

The larvae feed on Lannea coromandelica. They mine the leaves of their host plant.

References

Moths described in 1929
Heliozelidae